Collectors' Classics, Vols. 1–8 are a set of  Decca Records compilation albums by Bing Crosby featuring songs from his various films over the years. The albums were issued as 10” LPs numbered DL6008 to DL6015 and 4-disc 45rpm sets numbered 9-194 to 9–201.

Background
In January 1951, Bing Crosby was honoured with various awards and special radio programs on what was described as his 20th anniversary as a single in show business. Decca celebrated by issuing this comprehensive set of the commercial recordings of songs from his films.

Track listings
Track listings from Bing Crosby discography. Recording dates follow song titles.

Bing Crosby, Collectors' Classics – Vol. 1
Track listing (DL 6008)

Bing Crosby, Collectors' Classics – Vol. 2
Track listing (DL 6009)

Bing Crosby, Collectors' Classics – Vol. 3
Track listing (DL 6010)

Bing Crosby, Collectors' Classics – Vol. 4
Track listing (DL 6011)

Bing Crosby, Collectors' Classics – Vol. 5
Track listing (DL 6012)

Bing Crosby, Collectors' Classics – Vol. 6
Track listing (DL 6013)

Bing Crosby, Collectors' Classics – Vol. 7
Track listing (DL 6014)

Bing Crosby, Collectors' Classics – Vol. 8
Track listing (DL 6015)

References 

Bing Crosby compilation albums
Decca Records compilation albums
1951 compilation albums
Album series